Ridvan Vait Bode (born June 26, 1959) is an Albanian politician.  A member of the Democratic Party of Albania, he is a former Minister of Finance in the cabinet of Sali Berisha.

Other sources
Biographical data from the Albanian government (in Albanian)

1959 births
Living people
Democratic Party of Albania politicians
Government ministers of Albania
Finance ministers of Albania
People from Korçë
21st-century Albanian politicians